Valerios Leonidis (born February 14, 1966) is a Greek former Olympic medalist weightlifter and current weightlifting trainer. He has won Olympic silver medal at 1996 Atlanta Olympic games in 64 kg division. Also two silver and one bronze World Championship medals. He has competed in different weight classes from 60 kg to 69 kg. His rivalry with world-record holder Naim Süleymanoğlu in the men's 64 kg was a very popular part of the 1996 Olympic Games in Atlanta, in which he won the silver medal. 

Leonidis was born in Yessentuki, Russia, to a Pontic Greek family. He was a member of the national weightlifting team of the Soviet Union from 1982 to 1990 and he moved to Greece in 1991. He was named the 1994 Greek Male Athlete of the Year.

References

External links
Profile at Sports-reference.com

1966 births
Living people
People from Yessentuki
Soviet male weightlifters
Naturalized citizens of Greece
Greek male weightlifters
Weightlifters at the 1992 Summer Olympics
Weightlifters at the 1996 Summer Olympics
Weightlifters at the 2000 Summer Olympics
Medalists at the 1996 Summer Olympics
Olympic medalists in weightlifting
Olympic weightlifters of Greece
Olympic silver medalists for Greece
Weightlifting coaches
Pontic Greeks
European Weightlifting Championships medalists
World Weightlifting Championships medalists